KRXT is a Rockdale, Texas based radio station. It airs on 98.5 MHz and is under ownership of Charles W. McGregor (community radio, affiliated with ABC). This station airs a country music format.

External links
KRXT official website

RXT-FM
Country radio stations in the United States
Radio stations established in 1980